Crying Macho Man is an online comic strip created by Jose Cabrera and updated weekly on his official website. Making its online debut in August 2005, the comic is best known for its satirical views on politics, the media, popular culture, and Latin machismo. The series has garnered enough popularity and media attention for a published compilation release in 2007 with future collections in development.

History
Prior to the creation of Crying Macho Man, Cabrera had made his first venture in to comics with the semi-autobiographical series JOSE: Life According to Jose Cabrera. He soon abandoned the project however, finding it to be boring and tedious to write about his daily life, and moved on to a series of strips entitled The Adventures of Abusive Stepfather. Although not directly related, the comic's absurd sense of humor directly influenced the development of Crying Macho Man. Originally a joke amongst friends, Crying Macho Man has garnered enough popularity for Cabrera to maintain an official website, which he updates weekly. A compilation of the original series was released in 2007 entitled, The Premiere Crying Macho Man Collection: Prime Cut. A second book, You So Loco!, was released in May 2008.

Recurring characters
Crying Macho Man (a.k.a. El Macho) - Despite being the titular character and face of the franchise, the Crying Macho Man has yet to make an appearance in the strip. The Crying Macho Man draws some comparison to Mad Magazine's Alfred E. Neuman character as having “the ability to go anywhere from week to week”.
Fidel Castro - Cuban President Fidel Castro makes several appearances in the strip for humorous effect. One storyline included Castro's failed attempts at renting a copy of Sex and the City through Netflix.
Prince - The musician Prince has also appeared in the Crying Macho Man strips, often shown to have conversations over the phone with Fidel Castro.
Fry Cook - The self-proclaimed "Greatest Chef in the world" known for his rather unclean cooking methods and horrible body odor.
Cleveland the Quadriplegic Detective - A quadriplegic detective who solves crimes by reading messages in his bodily fluids.

References

External links
Official site

2000s webcomics
2005 webcomic debuts
Webcomics in print
American comedy websites
Male characters in comics
Satirical webcomics
Comics characters introduced in 2005
Cultural depictions of Fidel Castro
Prince (musician)